Acadia was a provincial electoral district in Alberta, Canada mandated to return a single member to the Legislative Assembly of Alberta from 1913 to 1940.

History
The Acadia electoral district was formed from the Sedgewick electoral district prior to the 1913 Alberta general election. The Acadia electoral district would be abolished and the Acadia-Coronation electoral district would be formed in its place prior to the 1940 Alberta general election.

Members of the Legislative Assembly (MLAs)

Election results

1910s

1920s

1930s

See also
List of Alberta provincial electoral districts
Acadia (electoral district)
Acadia-Coronation

References

Further reading

External links
Elections Alberta
The Legislative Assembly of Alberta

Former provincial electoral districts of Alberta